Vilma is a feminine first name. People named Vilma include:
Vilma Abrahamsson (born 1999), Swedish football player
Vilma Bánky (1901–1991), Hungarian silent film actress
Vilma Bardauskienė (born 1953), Lithuanian long jumper
Vilma Beck (1810–1851), Hungarian writer and freedom fighter
Vilma Charlton (born 1946), Jamaican sprinter
Vilma Cibulková (born 1963), Czech film and stage actress
Vilma Degischer (1911–1992), Austrian actress
Vilma Ebsen (1911–2007), American musical theatre and film actress, sister of actor Buddy Ebsen
Vilma Egresi (1936–1979), Hungarian sprint canoer
Vilma Espín (1930–2007), Cuban revolutionary, feminist and chemical engineer, wife of Raúl Castro
Vilma Ferrán (1940–2014), Argentine actress
Vilma G. Holland (1928–2005), Puerto Rican artist
Vilma Hollingbery (born 1932), British actress
Vilma Hugonnai (1847–1922), Hungarian medical doctor 
Vilma Rose Hunt (1926–2012), Australian scientist and writer 
Vilma Ibarra (born 1960), Argentine politician
Vilma Jamnická (1906–2008), Slovak actress
Vilma Kadlečková (born 1971), Czech science fiction and Fantasy writer
Vilma Luik (born 1959), Estonian actress
Vilma Lwoff-Parlaghy (1863–1923), Hungarian painter 
Vilma Cecilia Morales (born 1954), Honduran lawyer
Vilma Nenganga (born 1996), Angolan handball player
Vilma Pázmándy (1839–1919), Hungarian noblewoman
Vilma Peña (born 1960), Costa Rican long-distance runner
Vilma Reyes (born 1958), Puerto Rican poet, storyteller and educator
Vilma Rimšaitė (born 1983), Lithuanian BMX cyclist
Vilma Ripoll (born 1954), Argentine politician
Vilma Rudzenskaitė (born 1966), Lithuanian orienteer
Vilma Sindona Eichholz (1926-1995), German-born Canadian Esperantist
Vilma Silva (born 1997), Angolan handball player
Vilma Socorro Martínez (born 1943), American lawyer, civil rights activist and diplomat, first woman U.S. Ambassador to Argentina
Vilma Santos (born 1953), Philippine actress and politician
Vilma Tanskanen (born 1995), Finnish ice hockey player
Vilma Vaattovaara (born 1993), Finnish ice hockey player
Vilma von Webenau (1875-1953), Austrian composer
Vilma Zamora (born c. 1977), Mexican beauty pageant winner

See also
Wilma (disambiguation)

Czech feminine given names
English feminine given names
Estonian feminine given names
Filipino feminine given names
Finnish feminine given names
Hungarian feminine given names
Lithuanian feminine given names
Slovak feminine given names
Spanish feminine given names

de:Wilma
it:Wilma